List of works by or about the British author Ian McDonald.

Novels

Desolation Road series
 Desolation Road (1988)
 The Luncheonette of Lost Dreams (1992) (short story)
 Ares Express (2001)

Chaga saga
 "Toward Kilimanjaro" (1990) (short story)
 Chaga (1995, US: Evolution's Shore)
 Kirinya (1997)
 "Tendeléo's Story" (2000) (short story)

India in 2047
 River of Gods (2004)
 The Djinn's Wife (2006) in Asimov's Science Fiction – Hugo Award for Best Novelette winner

Everness series
 Planesrunner (2011)
 Be My Enemy (2012)
 Empress of the Sun (2014)

Luna series
 New Moon (2015) - BSFA award nominee, winner of the Gaylactic Spectrum Award
 Wolf Moon (2017)
 Moon Rising (2019)

Standalone novels
 Out on Blue Six (1989)
 King of Morning, Queen of Day (1991)
 Hearts, Hands and Voices (1992, US: The Broken Land)
 Necroville (1994, US: Terminal Café)
 Scissors Cut Paper Wrap Stone (1994) - 2013 e-book includes The Tear
 Sacrifice of Fools (1996)
 Brasyl (2007) – Hugo Award nominee, winner of the BSFA award, Nominated for the £50,000 Warwick Prize for Writing
 The Dervish House (2010) – Hugo Award nominee, Clarke Award nominee, winner of the BSFA award
 Time Was (2018)

Graphic novels
 Kling Klang Klatch (1992) (graphic novel, illustrated by David Lyttleton)

Short fiction

Collections
 Empire Dreams (1988)
 Speaking in Tongues (1992)
 Cyberabad Days (2009)
 The Best of Ian McDonald (2015)

Short stories

 "The Islands of the Dead" (1982)
 "The Catharine Wheel" (Our Lady of Tharsis) (1984) (also published as "The Catharine Wheel")
 "Christian" (1984)
 "Scenes from a Shadowplay" (1985)
 "Empire Dreams" (1985)" (also appeared as: Empire Dreams; Ground Control to Major Tom)
 "Approaching Perpendicular" (1988)
 "Radio Marrakech" (1988)
 "The Island of the Dead" (1988)
 "Unfinished Portrait of the King of Pain by Van Gogh" (1988)
 "Visits to Remarkable Cities" (1988)
 "Vivaldi" (1988)
 "King of Morning, Queen of Day" (1988)
 "Gardenias" (1989)
 "Rainmaker Cometh" (1989)
 "Listen" (1989)
 "Atomic Avenue" (1990)
 "Speaking in Tongues" (1990)
 "Winning" (1990)
 "Fronds" (1990)
 "Toward Kilimanjaro" [Chaga] (1990)
 "Floating Dogs" (1991)
 "King of Morning, Queen of Day" (excerpt)" (1991)
 "Fragments of an Analysis of a Case of Hysteria" (1991)
 "Brody Loved the Masai Woman" (1992)
 "Innocents" (1992)
 "The Best and the Rest of James Joyce" (1992)
 "Fat Tuesday" (1992)
 "Big Chair" (1992)
 "Legitimate Targets" (1993)
 "Some Strange Desire" (1993)
 "The Undifferentiated Object of Desire" (1993)
 "Blue Motel" (1994)
 "Scissors Cut Paper Wrap Stone" (1994)
 "Steam" (1995)
 "The Time Garden: A Faery Story" (1995)
 "Frooks" (1995)
 "Faithful" (1996)
 "Islington" (1996)
 "Recording Angel" (1996)
 "The Further Adventures of Baron Munchausen: The Gulf War" (1996)
 "Jesus' Blood Never Failed Me Yet" (1997)
 "The Five O'Clock Whistle" (1997)
 "After Kerry" (1997)
 "The Days of Solomon Gursky" (1998)
 "Breakfast on the Moon, with Georges" (1999)
 "Tendeléo's Story" [Chaga] (2000)
 "The Twenty Five Mile High Club" (2002)
 "The Old Cosmonaut and the Construction Worker Dream of Mars" (2002)
 "The Hidden Place" (2002)
 "Written in the Stars" (2005) in Constellations
 "The Little Goddess" (2005)
 "Kyle Meets the River" (2006)
 "Sanjeev and Robotwallah" (2007)
 "Verthandi's Ring" (2007)
 "The Tear" (2008)
 "[A Ghost Samba]" (2008)
 "The Dust Assassin" (2008)
 "An Eligible Boy" (2008)
 "Vishnu at the Cat Circus" (2009)
 "A Little School" (2009)
 "Tonight We Fly" (2010)
 "Digging" (2011)
 "A Smart Well-Mannered Uprising of the Dead" (2011)
 "Driftings" (2013)
 "The Queen of the Night's Aria" (2013) in Old Mars (anthology)
 "The Revolution Will Not Be Refrigerated" (2013) in Twelve Tomorrows 2014 (anthology)
 "Nanonauts! In Battle with Tiny Death-subs!" (2014) in Robot Uprisings (anthology)
 "The Fifth Dragon" (2014, novelette) in Reach for Infinity (anthology)
 "Botanica Veneris: Thirteen Papercuts by Ida Countess Rathangan" (2015) in Old Venus (anthology)

Critical studies and reviews of McDonald's work
 Clute, John, & Nicholls, Peter (eds). The Encyclopedia of Science Fiction. New York: St Martin’s Press, 1993. .
 Lennard, John, Ian McDonald: Chaga / Evolution's Shore. Tirril: Humanities-Ebooks, 2007.
 Reviews Planesrunner.

References

External links
 

Bibliographies by writer
Bibliographies of British writers
Science fiction bibliographies